Haunting Shadows is a 1919 American silent comedy film directed by Henry King and starring H.B. Warner, Edward Peil Sr., and Charles Hill Mailes. It was based on 1906 novel which had previously been made into a 1915 silent film, and would later be remade by Republic Pictures as a sound film The House of a Thousand Candles.

Cast
 H.B. Warner as John Glenarm 
 Edward Peil Sr. as Arthur Pickering 
 Charles Hill Mailes as Bates 
 Frank Lanning as Morgan 
 Florence Oberle as Sister Theresa 
 Margaret Livingston as Marian Deveraux 
 Harry Kendall as Reverend Paul Stoddard 
 Patricia Fox as Gladys Armstrong 
 Charles K. French as John Glenarm Sr

References

Bibliography
 Donald W. McCaffrey & Christopher P. Jacobs. Guide to the Silent Years of American Cinema. Greenwood Publishing, 1999.

External links

1919 films
1919 comedy films
Silent American comedy films
Films directed by Henry King
American silent feature films
1910s English-language films
American black-and-white films
Film Booking Offices of America films
Films based on American novels
Remakes of American films
1910s American films
1920s American films